The second series of Comedy Playhouse, the long-running BBC series, aired from 1 March 1963 to 12 April 1963. All the episodes were written by Ray Galton and Alan Simpson.

Background
The second series, which was in black and white, consisted of six episodes, each of which had a different cast and storyline. None of the episodes made it to its own series. All episodes were aired on Friday; Our Man in Moscow at 8.45pm, And Here, All The Way From... and A Clerical Error at 8.50pm, Impasse at 8pm, Have You Read This Notice at 8.20pm and The Handyman at 7.50pm. Have You Read This Notice is the only episode of this second series which is listed as being lost.

Episodes

References

Mark Lewisohn, "Radio Times Guide to TV Comedy", BBC Worldwide Ltd, 2003
British TV Comedy Guide for Comedy Playhouse

Comedy Playhouse (series 2)